William George Evans (23 March 1883 – 23 January 1946) was a Welsh international rugby union and rugby league forward who won one cap for the Wales national rugby union team and two caps for the Wales national rugby league team. He turned professional on 1911, signing for Leeds from Brynmawr RFC.

His one appearance for Wales came in a Five Nations game against Ireland on 11 March 1911 in Cardiff, a match that Wales won 16–0.

References

1883 births
1946 deaths
Rugby union forwards
Rugby union players from Nantyglo
Wales international rugby union players
Welsh rugby union players